49 Cassiopeiae is a binary star system in the northern circumpolar constellation of Cassiopeia. It is visible to the naked eye as a faint, yellow-hued point of light with an apparent visual magnitude of 5.22. The system is located about 412 light years away from the Sun, based on parallax. The pair had an angular separation of  along a position angle of 244°, as of 2008, with the brighter component being of magnitude 5.32 and its faint companion having magnitude 12.30.

The primary, designated component A, is an aging giant star with a stellar classification of G8III. It is 302 million years old with 3.3 times the mass of the Sun. With the supply of hydrogen at its core exhausted, the star has now expanded to 17 times the Sun's radius. It is a red clump giant on the horizontal branch, which indicates it is generating energy through the fusion of helium at its core. Its faint secondary companion, component B, is of an unknown spectral type. It has a temperature similar to the primary, but a luminosity much lower than the Sun's.

References

G-type giants
Horizontal-branch stars
Double stars

Cassiopeia (constellation)
BD+75 0086
Cassiopeiae, 49
012339
009763
0592